David Carslaw Warnock (25 December 1910 – 19 March 1976) was a Scottish footballer who played as an outside right. His main spell as a professional was at Aberdeen where he featured regularly, though not always a first choice, between 1931 and 1939 when he moved on to Dundee; however, the outbreak of World War II meant he never made an official competitive appearance for the Dens Park club.

References

1910 births
1976 deaths
Scottish footballers
Sportspeople from East Renfrewshire
Footballers from Aberdeen
Association football outside forwards
Scottish Football League players
Scottish Junior Football Association players
Banks O' Dee F.C. players
Dundee F.C. players
Aberdeen F.C. players